BK Olomoucko, for sponsorship reasons known as BK Redstone Olomoucko, is a Czech professional basketball club based in Prostějov. Founded in 2017, the team currently plays in the NBL, the highest tier of Czech basketball. The team entered the NBL in 2017–18, when it replaced Orli Prostějov, which was dissolved that summer.

Season by season

References

External links
Official website 
Eurobasket.com BK Olomoucko Page

Basketball teams in the Czech Republic
Basketball teams established in 2017
2017 establishments in the Czech Republic
BK